Deborah Babashoff (born 1970) is an American former competition swimmer who won a bronze medal in the 800-meter freestyle event at the 1986 World Aquatics Championships. Next year she won a silver medal at the 1987 Pan American Games in the same event, and in 1989 a national title in the 1500-meter freestyle.

Debbie was born to Vera and Jack Babashoff in Whittier, California. Her father had been a swimming instructor in Hawaii and always wanted his own children to become Olympians. Both of her parents are second-generation Russian Americans.

Her older sister Shirley (b. 1957) and older brothers Jack, Jr., (b. 1955) and Bill (b. 1959) were also swimmers who competed internationally.

References

1970 births
Living people
American female freestyle swimmers
Sportspeople from Whittier, California
Swimmers at the 1987 Pan American Games
World Aquatics Championships medalists in swimming
Pan American Games silver medalists for the United States
Pan American Games medalists in swimming
Medalists at the 1987 Pan American Games
21st-century American women
20th-century American women